The 2019 German Figure Skating Championships was held on December 21–23, 2018 at the Eissporthalle Stuttgart in Stuttgart. Skaters competed in the disciplines of men's singles, ladies' singles, pair skating, and ice dance on the senior, junior, and novice levels. The results of the national championships were among the criteria used to choose the German teams to the 2019 World Championships and 2019 European Championships.

Medalists

Senior

Senior results

Men

Ladies

Pairs

Ice dance

External links
 2019 German Championships: Senior results at the Deutsche Eislauf Union
 2019 German Championships: Junior and novice results at the Deutsche Eislauf Union

German Championships
German Figure Skating Championships
Figure Skating Championships